Muz-TV (from Музыкальное телевидение - Music Television) is a Russian music TV channel, broadcasting since 1996. It is largely modelled after western MTV and predates launching of MTV Russia in 1998. Muz-TV was founded by Sergey Lisovskiy. The general director of Muz-TV is Arman Davletarov. Today Muz-TV is owned by UTH Russia, which is, in turn, 49% owned by mtv.

Muz-TV's format is Russian pop music videos, although international pop, hip-hop and contemporary R&B can be occasionally seen as well. There are charts for both local and international acts, voted via channel's website.

Much like MTV, in the late 2000s Muz-TV became more an entertainment channel broadcasting reality shows, rather than a music channel. After the re-branding of 16 September 2012 "Muz-TV" has moved to a new frequency, changing the concept back to the "musical" On its old frequency, a new youth entertainment channel "U", which consists of programs previously aired on the Muz-TV (except musical programs), as well as new programs and series, both purchased and own production.

On December 14, 2012, the Muz-TV channel became free again, and received the right to broadcast on digital television

Muz-TV Music Awards
Annual Muz-TV music awards is presented to Russian pop musicians since 2003. For each nomination, three nominees are chosen by the channel's jury, and then nominees are voted via SMS. The Awards were presented annually during a show in Olimpiysky until the venue's demolishment. Subsequent galas were held in the Megasport Sport Palace in Moscow. In 2014, the Awards travelled for a once-off to Nur-Sultan, Kazakhstan.

Muz-TV music awards is object of sharp criticism in media. The major issue is a repetitive list of nominees, for example, Zveri have been awarded "Best rock act" six times in a row, and Dima Bilan became "Artist of the Year" five times in six years. Another issue is lip syncing on the award ceremony.

2021 Muz-TV Awards controversy
In 2021, the award ceremony led to widespread controversy in Russian music industry as some musical producers called out the show for missing its focus on music, including Maxim Fadeev, Viktor Drobysh and Iosif Prigozhin. Muz-TV presenter and singer Arthur Pirozhkov winning the award for Best Singer caused a stir among the audience. Nominee Morgenshtern stormed the stage while Pirozhkov was receiving his award and sounded his disagreement with the result. On multiple occasions during the show, Morgenshtern sounded of his disappointment. During the remainder of the gala several attendees, including Timati and Egor Kreed, spoke out their surprise for Morgenshtern not winning the award.

Russian gay propaganda law fine
Meanwhile, the show was left investigated for breaking the Russian gay propaganda law, after pop star Philipp Kirkorov and rapper Dava entered the red carpet as part of a bridal procession with only men. In 2021, Moscow's Basmanny district court fined Muz-TV 1 million rubles ($13,750), the maximum fine for the penalty.

Programs from September 2012

Clip blocks
 Muz-TV Hit - the main music non-stop.
 Muz-Charge - morning music block.
 Ours - Russian music block.
 Fresh
 Gold Collection
 Urban Hit
 Rock Hit
 Love Hit
 Sexy Hour
 Dance Hit

Charts
 Muz-TV Chart
 Russian Chart
 TopHit Chart
 Billboard Chart
 Popular Chart
 TikTok Chart
 DFM Dance Chart
  Chart
 TOP-15 
 Teen Chart

Other programs
 PRO-News
 PRO-Review
 10 Most...
 Stars Lights
 Concerts and music shows

Coming soon
 Clips in this Theme
 Artist Hour
 Special birthday marathons popular musicians (including display of all clips, programs, concerts, etc.).

References

External links

Music television channels
Television channels in Russia
Television channels and stations established in 1996
1996 establishments in Russia
Music organizations based in Russia

Umor FM
Like FM